The Airport and Airway Development Act of 1970 (Pub.L. 91-258) was a United States federal law passed during the 91st Congress, and signed into law by President Richard Nixon in conjunction with the Airport and Airway Revenue Act on May 21, 1970. The act was meant to fill funding gaps in the airport and airway system, which had become inadequate due to the rapid growth of aviation. The legislation was estimated to generate greater than $11 billion in funds,

Together, the two acts created and planned funding for the Airport and Airway Trust Fund (Airport Trust Fund), which was initiated on July 1, 1970. The new Airport Trust Fund was modeled on the Federal Highway Trust Fund, and would be fulfilled by new aviation-related excise taxes. These new taxes, including a tax on aviation fuels, a tax placed on tickets sold to passengers on domestic and international flights, a tax on waybills, and a new tax on aircraft registration, were expected to provide the anticipated $11 billion trust fund. These taxes would feed into the Airport Trust Fund in order to pay for airport development, as well as "acquiring, establishing, and improving air navigational
facilities." The fund was authorized to pay for these improvements using $280-million-a-year grants over a five-year period.

It is believed that this user fee system would be advantageous compared to a flat tax, because it provided a predictable level of funding, allowed for the trust to plan far ahead, and assured fees meant for aviation related improvements would not be divided amongst unrelated fields.

Six years after the act became law, the Act was augmented by the Airport and Airway Development Act Amendments of 1976. The 1976 legislation was signed into law by President Gerald Ford in order to "make possible the continuing modernization of our airways, airports, and related facilities in communities throughout the 50 States." Ford stated these amendments would combat inflation and referred to the system as creating a "'pay-as-you-fly' program".

See also

Airport Improvement Program
Federal Airport Act of 1946
List of Class B airports in the United States
List of Class C airports in the United States

References

External links
Murphy, Robert P. (1999-02-19). Whether the Airport and Airway Trust Fund was created solely to finance aviation infrastructure (PDF). Letter to The Honorable Frank R. Wolf Chairman, Subcommittee on Transportation and Related Agencies United States General Accounting Office. Retrieved July 2007.

1970 in law
1970 in aviation
Aviation in the United States
United States Department of the Treasury
United States Department of Transportation
United States federal transportation legislation